The INS Herev (Sword) is a Sa'ar 4.5-class missile boat of the Israeli Navy, built by Israel Shipyards Ltd. and commissioned in May 2002.

See also
 INS Tarshish
 INS Sufa

External links
 Boy with Cancer Fulfils His Dream aboard an Israel Navy Ship, February 28, 2014

References

 The INS Hetz proceeds along a multiple-minded mission set, ready to react in an offensive or defensive nature. - Retrieved 29 September 2014

Sa'ar 4.5-class missile boats

2002 ships
Ships built in Israel
Naval ships of Israel
Missile boats of the Israeli Navy